Sulayman Marreh (born 15 January 1996) is a Gambian professional footballer who plays as a defensive midfielder and centre-back for Belgian First Division A club Gent and the Gambia national team.

Club career
Born in Banjul, Marreh made his senior debuts with Abuko United FC. In 2011, he was spotted by Gambia U-17's staff ahead of 2011 African U-17 Championship, and despite being left out of the final cut, he joined Samger FC. In March 2014 he moved to Granada CF in Spain, being assigned to the reserves in Segunda División B, for a reported fee of one million dalasi.

Marreh made his senior debut with the side on 15 March 2014, starting in a 0–0 draw against FC Cartagena; roughly a month later he netted his first goal abroad, scoring the first of a 6–1 home win over Écija Balompié.

On 21 March, Marreh was called up to the Andalusians' main squad ahead of the La Liga match against Elche CF; he remained on the bench in the 1–0 win at the Estadio Nuevo Los Cármenes, however. He made his first-team debut on 17 October, starting in a 0–1 home loss against Rayo Vallecano.

On 10 July 2017, after having his federative rights assigned to Watford, Marreh was loaned to Segunda División club Real Valladolid for one year. The following January, his loan with Valladolid was cancelled and he joined UD Almería on a loan deal for the remainder of the campaign.

In March 2019 Belgian First Division A club Eupen announced they had taken up the option to sign Marreh on a contract until June 2021, having initially signed him on loan for the 2018–19 season.

International career
After being left out of the under-17 squad, Marreh made his debut with the main squad on 9 February 2011, coming on as a substitute in a 1–3 loss against Guinea-Bissau at Lisbon, Portugal. He played his first official match on 15 June of the following year, starting in a 1–4 2013 Africa Cup of Nations qualification loss against Algeria.
He played in the 2021 Africa cup of Nations, his national team's first continental tournament, where they made a sensational quarter-final.

Career statistics

Scores and results list Gambia's goal tally first, score column indicates score after each Marreh goal.

References

External links
 
 
 

1996 births
Living people
People from Banjul
Gambian footballers
Association football midfielders
The Gambia international footballers
2021 Africa Cup of Nations players
La Liga players
Segunda División B players
Belgian Pro League players
Club Recreativo Granada players
Granada CF footballers
Watford F.C. players
Real Valladolid players
UD Almería players
K.A.S. Eupen players
K.A.A. Gent players
Gambian expatriate footballers
Gambian expatriate sportspeople in Spain
Expatriate footballers in Spain
Gambian expatriate sportspeople in England
Expatriate footballers in England